Music Theatre Louisville was a non-profit organization in Louisville, Kentucky, dedicated to producing, presenting, and developing diverse and affordable entertainment. Up through 2008, the company staged several shows during the summer at Iroquois Amphitheater in Iroquois Park. In 2009, the company moved to the Bomhard Theater at The Kentucky Center.

In 2008, the company officially changed its name to Broadway at Iroquois, banking on the name recognition of its Iroquois Park location. However, after its move to the Kentucky Center, they reverted to the Music Theatre Louisville moniker.

After the 2011 season, Music Theatre Louisville merged with Stage One Children's Theatre to form Stage One Family Theatre.

2011 season
Ain't Misbehavin'  June 24 - July 2, 2011
Guys and Dolls  July 15–23, 2011
Big: The Musical  August 5–14, 2011

2010 season
1776  June 25 - July 3, 2010
Nunsense  July 16–25, 2010
Annie  August 6–15, 2010

2009 season
Mame  June 26 - July 3, 2009
Singin' in the Rain  July 10–18, 2009
Hairspray  July 31 - August 9, 2009

2008 season
Willy Wonka & the Chocolate Factory  June 13–22, 2008
Cats  July 11–20, 2008
The Wiz  August 8–17, 2008

2007 season
A Year with Frog and Toad  May 8–18, 2007
Hello Dolly!, June 15–24, 2007
42nd Street, July 6–15, 2007
Disney's High School Musical, August 3–12, 2007
Oliver!, September 7–16, 2007

2006 season
Schoolhouse Rock Live!  May 9–20, 2006
West Side Story, June 16–25, 2006
Anything Goes, July 7–16, 2006
Rodgers and Hammerstein's Cinderella, August 4–13, 2006
Brigadoon, September 8–17, 2006

2005 season
You're a Good Man, Charlie Brown
Disney's Beauty and the Beast
Seussical the Musical
Jesus Christ Superstar

For the first time in its history, Music Theatre Louisville produced a daytime show, intended mainly for smaller children, with its limited-run matinee production of You're a Good Man, Charlie Brown.

The 2005 Rising Stars Production was Floyd Central High School's production of Seussical the Musical. Like the previous Rising Stars show, Seussical had also been presented at the International Thespian Festival.

2004 seasonPeter PanJoseph and the Amazing Technicolor DreamcoatCrazy for YouIn 2004, Music Theatre Louisville added a unique new feature to their lineup, the Rising Stars Program. Beginning this year, one local high school would be selected to present their production from the previous school year, on the Iroquois Amphitheatre stage, in collaboration with the MTL crew.

For the inaugural Rising Stars Program, MTL selected Crazy for You, a production of New Albany High School in nearby New Albany, Indiana. This acclaimed production had also been taken to the International Thespian Festival in Lincoln, Nebraska that same summer.

The production was so successful that the Rising Stars Program became an annual event and a favorite of MTL audiences.

2003 seasonThe Wizard of OzAfter more than two years of renovation, Iroquois Amphitheatre reopened to the public in the summer of 2003. The renovation yielded (among other things) a roof over the front section of seating with multiple ceiling fans, new sound and lighting equipment, new concession areas sponsored by local vendors, a bright new show curtain, increased backstage and scene shop space, and comfortable new seats. Music Theatre Louisville marked the occasion with a premiere song-and-dance review in June 2003 before presenting their summer-long production of The Wizard of Oz.

2001 seasonThe FantasticksBroadway Under the StarsDue to the extensive renovation of Iroquois Amphitheatre, Music Theatre Louisville produced a limited season in the summer of 2001, with only one production on a small stage set up adjacent to the amphitheatre. There was no 2002 season.

Music Theatre Louisville also presented an original Broadway Revue show on the temporary stage in 2001, entitled "Broadway Under the Stars"

2000 seasonAnnieGodspell1999 seasonThe Music ManWest Side Story1998 seasonOnce Upon a MattressOklahoma!1997 seasonThe Sound of MusicTwo By TwoSeven Brides for Seven Brothers1996 seasonBye Bye BirdieA Chorus LineOliver!1995 seasonThe Secret GardenLittle Shop of HorrorsBrigadoon1994 season1776Rodgers and Hammerstein's CinderellaAnything Goes1993 seasonSouth PacificFiddler on the RoofThe Music Man1992 seasonHello, Dolly!Big RiverAnnie1991 seasonYou're a Good Man, Charlie Brown1990 season
For the 1990 season, Music Theatre Louisville moved to the Macauley Theatre (now the Brown Theatre) in downtown Louisville.West Side StoryLittle Shop of HorrorsEvita1989 seasonAnnie Get Your GunCamelotThe Wizard of Oz1988 seasonOklahoma!GreasePeter Pan1987 seasonAnnieKismetPirates of Penzance''

References

External links
Iroquois Amphitheater

Arts organizations based in Louisville, Kentucky
Non-profit organizations based in Louisville, Kentucky
1987 establishments in Kentucky
2011 disestablishments in Kentucky